The 2009 AFC Champions League knockout stage was played from 26 May to 7 November 2009. A total of 16 teams competed in the knockout stage to decide the champions of the 2009 AFC Champions League.

Qualified teams
The winners and runners-up of each of the eight groups in the group stage qualified for the knockout stage. Both West Zone and East Zone had eight teams qualified.

Bracket

Note: while the bracket below shows the entire knockout stage, the draw for the round of 16 matches was determined at the time of the group draw, and kept teams from East and West Asia completely separate for that round.

The draw for the quarter-finals and beyond was held separately, and placed no restrictions on which teams could meet.

Round of 16
The draw for the round of 16 of the 2009 AFC Champions League was held on 7 January 2009, along with the draw for the group stage.

|-
|+West Asia

|}

|+East Asia
 

|}

West Asia

East Asia

Quarter-finals
The draw for the quarter-finals and the remaining knockout rounds took place at Kuala Lumpur, Malaysia on June 29, 2009.

|}

First leg

Second leg

Pohang Steelers won 5–4 on aggregate.

 
Nagoya Grampus won 4–3 on aggregate.

Umm-Salal won 4–3 on aggregate.

Al-Ittihad won 5–1 on aggregate.

Semi-finals

                       

|}

First leg

Second leg

Al-Ittihad won 8–3 on aggregate.

Pohang won 4–1 on aggregate.

Final

References

Knockout stage